Test Drive is a series of racing video games that were originally published by Accolade until they were bought by Infogrames (later Atari), the first game was released in 1987 and has since been followed by several sequels and spin-offs, the last of which was released in 2012.

Gameplay

In Test Drive, the player typically uses one of several exotic performance cars to race to a finish line against opponents or in a time limit, while avoiding traffic and police.

Unlimited series

Test Drive Unlimited includes an open world environment and allows for the purchase of houses, cars and character customisation.

History

Early titles (1987–1991)
In 1987, Accolade published Test Drive as a computer game worldwide, while Electronic Arts released the game in the United Kingdom. The quality of the Amiga, Atari ST, Commodore 64, and DOS ports differ from each other. The Amiga version's detailed visuals and audio realistically depicted the game's racing theme, while its Atari ST counterpart used simplified graphics and sound effects. The Commodore 64 and DOS ports were of similar quality to the Amiga version. The gameplay was kept intact for all platforms.

Test Drive was a commercial success, with sales having surpassed 250,000 copies by November 1989. It received generally positive reviews from video game critics. Computer Gaming World stated in 1987 that Test Drive "offers outstanding graphics and the potential to 'hook' every Pole Position fan". Compute! praised the excellent graphics and sound, but noted that the game only had one course. The game was reviewed in 1988 in Dragon #132 by Hartley, Patricia, and Kirk Lesser in "The Role of Computers" column. The reviewers gave the game 4 out of 5 stars.

Test Drive spawned several sequels and spin-offs. Distinctive Software developed its 1989 sequel, The Duel: Test Drive II, using several software libraries. Distinctive (as Unlimited Software, Inc.) used the aforementioned software libraries for an MS-DOS port of Outrun, resulting in the Accolade v. Distinctive lawsuit. Distinctive Software won, so the rights to make the Test Drive games without the source code transferred to Accolade. The court also found that Accolade had failed to demonstrate that the balance of hardships was in its favor. Another sequel, Test Drive III: The Passion, was developed and published by Accolade in 1990.

Revival series (1997–2004)
After a few years of the franchise being in dormancy, In 1997 Accolade reinvented the franchise with brand new titles. The first of these was Test Drive: Off-Road, an off-road truck racing spinoff, and Test Drive 4, the first video game developed by Pitbull Syndicate.

In 1998, Pitbull Syndicate developed two further Test Drive titles, Test Drive 4X4 (also known as Test Drive Off-Road 2), a sequel to the Test Drive: Off-Road spinoff, and Test Drive 5; both games were the two last entries in the series to be published by Accolade.

As a result, Test Drive 6 was the first game in the series to be published by the newly named Infogrames North America in 1999. An in-house team at Infogrames North America would go onto develop Test Drive Off-Road 3 in 1999, and would also go to develop Test Drive Cycles, which was cancelled in June 2000 with the exception of the Game Boy Color version.

In 2000, due to copyright problems between Infogrames North America and Infogrames Multimedia over the Test Drive trademark, Cryo Interactive picked up publishing rights to Test Drive 6 in Europe for a May 2000 release, while Infogrames Multimedia released Test Drive Off-Road 3 under the name of 4x4 World Trophy in April 2000. Around this time, Infogrames North America released Le Mans 24 Hours and the Dreamcast version of V-Rally 2 under the localised names of Test Drive Le Mans and Test Drive V-Rally respectively. A Nintendo 64 localisation of Michelin Rally Masters: Race of Champions known as Test Drive Rally was also planned, but this was cancelled in February 2000. Fellow Game Boy Color titles included Test Drive Cycles and Test Drive 2001, an update to the GBC version of Test Drive 6.

In November 2001, the last entry in the Off-Road subseries - Test Drive Off-Road Wide Open, known in Europe simply as Off-Road Wide Open, was released on the PlayStation 2, being developed by Angel Studios. An Xbox port was released a year later with additional content and graphic improvements.

In May 2002, Infogrames released a reboot of the series titled TD Overdrive: The Brotherhood of Speed (Released as Test Drive in North America) and was the last entry in the series to be developed by Pitbull Syndicate. It was also the first entry in the series to feature a storyline.

The next game in the series, Test Drive: Eve of Destruction, was developed by Monster Games in 2003, and was released in 2004. The game was released in Europe under the name of Driven to Destruction.

Unlimited series (2006–present)
Test Drive Unlimited, developed by Eden Games and released in 2006 and 2007, features an open world modeled after the Hawaiian island of Oahu. Its sequel Test Drive Unlimited 2 was released in 2011 and includes both Oahu and the Spanish island of Ibiza. Test Drive: Ferrari Racing Legends was developed by Slightly Mad Studios and published by Rombax Games under license from Atari, in celebration of the 65th anniversary of Italian sports car manufacturer Ferrari, featuring Formula One, sports cars, and rally cars.

In 2016, French publisher Bigben Interactive (later renamed Nacon) acquired the Test Drive intellectual property from Atari, with plans to reboot the franchise. In 2018, Bigben acquired French racing game developer Kylotonn, with Roman Vincent, president of Kylotonn suggesting they were working on the next installment of Test Drive.

In April 2020, Nacon filed a trade mark to the Intellectual Property Office for Test Drive Solar Crown, the last two words referring to the Solar Crown in-universe racing competition series featured in Test Drive Unlimited 2. The full title of the next game in the series is Test Drive Unlimited Solar Crown. The Kylotonn-developed game will feature a 1:1 recreation of Hong Kong Island.

Games

References

External links

 
Nacon franchises
Video game franchises
Video game franchises introduced in 1987